= Javier Bordas =

Spanish businessman

Javier Bordas de Togores (born 5 March 1961) is a Spanish businessman who was sporting director of Barcelona from 2010 to 2020.

== Career ==
In 2010, Bordas was appointed director of Spanish La Liga side Barcelona.
